Aleksei Aleksandrovich Bakharev (12 October 1976 – 18 March 2022) was a Russian and Ukrainian professional footballer who played as a midfielder.

International career
Bakharev played for two national teams: he played for Russia on 18 November 1998 in a friendly against Brazil and for Ukraine on 21 August 2002 in a friendly against Iran.

References

External links
 Player profile 

1976 births
2022 deaths
People from Volgograd Oblast
Russian footballers
Ukrainian footballers
Association football midfielders
Russia international footballers
Russia youth international footballers
Russia under-21 international footballers
Ukraine international footballers
Russian Premier League players
Ukrainian Premier League players
FC Lada-Tolyatti players
FC Spartak Moscow players
FC Rotor Volgograd players
FC Shakhtar Donetsk players
FC Rubin Kazan players
Dual internationalists (football)
Naturalized citizens of Ukraine
FC Nosta Novotroitsk players
FC Mashuk-KMV Pyatigorsk players
Russian expatriate footballers
Russian expatriate sportspeople in Ukraine
Expatriate footballers in Ukraine
FC Shakhtar-2 Donetsk players
Sportspeople from Volgograd Oblast